Rhinobrycon negrensis is a species of characin endemic to Brazil. This species is the only member of its genus.

References

Characidae
Monotypic fish genera
Fish of South America
Fish of Brazil
Endemic fauna of Brazil
Fish described in 1944